Chastity Wells-Armstrong (born 1971/1972) is an American politician, the first African-American to serve as mayor of Kankakee, Illinois, the county seat of Kankakee County.

Biography
Wells-Armstrong was raised on the east side of Kankakee and earned an associate's degree from Kankakee Community College and a B.A. and M.A. from Governors State University. After school, she worked as deputy district director for Illinois Democratic Congressman Bill Foster, she served as board vice president for the Harbor House Domestic Violence Shelter, and as education chairwoman of the Kankakee County Branch of the NAACP. In May 2015, she was elected to the Kankakee City Council representing the city's 5th ward. In the April 4, 2017 mayoral election, she defeated two-term mayor Republican Nina Epstein (the city's first female mayor) by a vote of 1,918 to 1,703 with 2nd Ward alderman Jim Stokes running as an Independent a distant third with 455 votes. Kankakee was roughly 40% white, 40% Black, and 20% Hispanic at the time. She was sworn in on May 1, 2017. She is the city's first Democratic mayor since Russell Johnson who served from 1985 to 1993. While mayor, she secured over $14 million in COVID funding for the city and laid the groundwork for the revitalization of the Kankakee River. On April 6, 2021, she was defeated by 6th Ward Republican Alderman Christopher Curtis. Curtis was sworn in on May 3, 2021.

On June 8, 2021, she was appointed by the Maywood Board of Trustees in a 5-2 vote as the next village manager of Maywood, Illinois; she was sworn in after the vote. She replaced Willie Norfleet Jr.  On June 3, 2022, the Maywood Board of Trustees voted 5-2 to suspend Chastity Wells-Armstrong as Village Manager.

References

1970s births
Living people
African-American mayors in Illinois
21st-century African-American people
Governors State University alumni
Women mayors of places in Illinois
African-American women mayors